Douglas Fabián Estay Hermosilla (born 25 April 1992) is a Chilean footballer who currently plays for Segunda División Profesional side Trasandino de Los Andes.

Douglas is the nephew of former football player Joel Estay.

Notes

External links
 
 

1992 births
Living people
sportspeople from Viña del Mar
Chilean footballers
Everton de Viña del Mar footballers
A.C. Barnechea footballers
Unión La Calera footballers
San Marcos de Arica footballers
San Luis de Quillota footballers
Trasandino footballers
Chilean Primera División players
Primera B de Chile players
Segunda División Profesional de Chile players
Association football midfielders